Symmetrischema dulce, the pepper-fruit-borer, is a moth in the family Gelechiidae. It was described by Povolný in 1984. It is found in Brazil.

The larvae feed on Capsicum frutescens.

References

Symmetrischema
Moths described in 1984